"The Big Fellah" is a song written by Larry Kirwan and recorded by Irish-American folk rock band Black 47. It was the first track on their 1994 album Home of the Brave. The song details the political career of Irish politician and soldier Michael Collins, nicknamed "The Big Fellah." The song begins in the GPO and ends with Collins' death at Béal na Bláth. It is written from the viewpoint of an Irish republican soldier against the Anglo-Irish Treaty.

The lyrics begin with a stanza in Irish, sung by Mary Martello.

The song was featured at the beginning of the episode "Lochan Mor" of Sons of Anarchy.

See also
Easter Rising
Irish War of Independence
Irish Republic

References

External links
Black 47.com

Black 47 songs
1994 songs
Cultural depictions of Michael Collins (Irish leader)